Suptavumab (INN; development code (REGN2222) is a humanized monoclonal antibody designed for the prevention of medically attended lower respiratory tract disease due to respiratory syncytial virus.

This experimental drug candidate was being developed by Regeneron Pharmaceuticals Inc until it was discontinued after unsuccessful Phase III clinical trials.

References 

Monoclonal antibodies
Abandoned drugs